The horizontal bar is an artistic gymnastics event held at the Summer Olympics. The event was first held for men at the first modern Olympics in 1896. It was held again in 1904, but not in 1900, 1908, 1912, or 1920 when no apparatus events were awarded medals. The horizontal bar was one of the components of the men's artistic individual all-around in 1900, 1908, and 1912, however. The men's horizontal bar returned as a medal event in 1924 and has been held every Games since. Horizontal bar scores were included in the individual all-around for 1924 and 1928, with no separate apparatus final. In 1932, the horizontal bar was entirely separate from the all-around. From 1936 to 1956, there were again no separate apparatus finals with the horizontal bar scores used in the all-around. Beginning in 1960, there were separate apparatus finals.

The 1896 Games also featured a team horizontal bar event.

Medalists

Men

Multiple medalists

Medalists by country

Gallery

Team horizontal bar

At the 1896 Olympics a team version of the horizontal bar was held. It was one of two team apparatus events in 1896, along with the team parallel bars. The team apparatus events were never held again.

The team horizontal bar event had 10 horizontal bars for the team to use. Teams in the 1896 team events could be large, with one in the parallel bars exceeding 30 members. Only one team competed in the team horizontal bar. Judges scored the teams on execution, rhythm, and technical difficulty.

References

Horizontal bar
Horizontal bar at the Olympics